This is a list of animated television series, made-for-television films, direct-to-video films, theatrical short subjects, and feature films produced by Filmation.  Note that some shows or new spin-offs of shows may be listed twice.

Television series

1960s

1970s

1980s

Television films, shorts and specials

Theatrical films

References 

Filmation
Filmation